Sar Gust-e Pain (also Romanized as Sar Gūst-e Pā’īn; also known as Sar Gasht-e Soflá, Sargosk-e Pā’īn, Sar Gost, and Sar Gost-e Pā’īn) is a village in Mosaferabad Rural District, Rudkhaneh District, Rudan County, Hormozgan Province, Iran. At the 2006 census, its population was 57, in 13 families.

References 

Populated places in Rudan County